Puperita pupa is a species of small sea snail, a marine gastropod mollusk in the family Neritidae, the nerites.

Description
The shell is thin but strong, globular, not presenting a prominent spire. There are 2 to 3 whorls, the outer lip is thin and sharp, the columellar area is polished and has a broad wall. The largest known specimens reach 10.6 mm. Th shell coloration is variable but is characterized by axial bands of black and white like a zebra. The opening is gray with an ocher-colored parietal callus area, and the operculum is bright yellow

Distribution
Puperita pupa is a nerite that is widely distributed in the area of the Caribbean Sea and the Gulf of Mexico:
 Caribbean Sea
 Cayman Islands
 Colombia
 Costa Rica
 Cuba
 Gulf of Mexico
 Hispaniola
 Jamaica
 Lesser Antilles
 Mexico
 San Andres
 Venezuela

This species occurs in brackish water on the West Indian island of Dominica.

References

External links

 ZipcodeZoo.com: Puperita pupa (Zebra Nerite)

Videos
 Youtube: Zebra Nerite snails (Puperita pupa)

Neritidae
Gastropods described in 1767
Taxa named by Carl Linnaeus

sv:Puperita tristis